The 2012–13 was the 26th season of División de Honor, the top flight women's water polo in Spain.

The season comprises regular season and championship playoff. The regular season started in October 2012 and finished on May 11, 2013. Upon completion regular season, top four teams played in the championship playoff.

The championship playoff began a week later with semifinals, and the final was played in late May.

Sabadell Astralpool was the defending champion and successfully defended its title of the previous season after defeating CN Mataró El Tot 2–0 in the championship final.

Teams

Regular season standings

Source:

Championship playoffs

Semifinals

1st leg

2nd leg

Sabadell Astralpool won series 2–0 and advanced to Semifinals

Mataró El Tot won series 2–0 and advanced to Semifinals

Final

1st leg

2nd leg

Sabadell Astralpool won Championship final series 2–0.

Individual awards
 Championship MVP:  Maica García, CN Sabadell Astralpool
 Best Goalkeeper:  Laura Ester, CN Sabadell Astralpool
 Top goalscorer:  Jennifer Pareja, CN Sabadell Astralpool

Top goal scorers
(regular season only)

See also
 División de Honor de Waterpolo 2012–13

References

External links
 Real Federación Española de Natación
 Competition format

División de Honor Femenina de Waterpolo
Seasons in Spanish water polo competitions
Spain
2012 in women's water polo
2013 in women's water polo
2012 in Spanish women's sport
2013 in Spanish women's sport